Lutwidge is a surname. Notable people with the surname include:

 Robert Wilfred Skeffington Lutwidge (1802–1873), English barrister and early photographer
 Skeffington Lutwidge (1737–1814), Royal Navy officer
 Charles Lutwidge Dodgson, English mathematician, logician, clergyman, photographer and author, better known by his pen name of Lewis Carroll